Decibel is an Italian punk rock band formed in 1977.

They debuted in 1978 with the album Punk and participated at the Sanremo Music Festival 1980 with the song "Contessa". Lead singer Enrico Ruggeri left the band at the end of the year to pursue a successful solo career. Capeccia, Muzio and Riboni continued until the end of the 1990s before disbanding. 

The band reformed in 2016 and released their first album of new material in almost twenty years, Noblesse oblige. In 2018 they returned to the Sanremo 2018 Music Festival with the song "Lettera dal Duca".

Members 
Current
 Enrico Ruggeri – vocals (1977-1980,  2016-present)
 Fulvio Muzio – guitar, keyboards, vocals (1978-1998, 2016-present)
 Silvio Capeccia – keyboards, vocals (1978-1998, 2016-present)

Former members
 Mino Riboni – bass, vocals (1978–1985)
 Pino Mancini – guitar (1977-1978)
 Erri Longhin – bass (1977-1978)
 Roberto Turatti – drums (1977-1978)

Discography

Studio albums 
 Punk (1978)
 Vivo da re (1980)
 Novecento (1982)
 Desaparecida (1998)
 Noblesse oblige (2017)
 L'anticristo (2018)

Live albums 
 Punksnotdead (2019)

References

Bibliography

External links 
 

Musical groups established in 1977
Italian punk rock groups
Italian new wave musical groups
Italian rock music groups
Musical groups from Milan